Distributed Simulation Engineering and Execution Process (DSEEP) is a standardized process for building federations of computer simulations. DSEEP is maintained by SISO and the standard is published as IEEE Std 1730-2010. DSEEP is a recommended systems engineering process in the NATO Modelling and Simulation Standards Profile AMSP-01, which also uses DSEEP as a framework for describing when other standards are to be used throughout a project process.

DSEEP can be used together with several interoperability standards, such as HLA, DIS and TENA. DSEEP was previously called FEDEP (Federation Development and Execution Process).

DSEEP steps

DSEEP consists of seven steps that can be carried out in a linear fashion, or iterated using a spiral approach. The steps are:

 Define Simulation Environment Objectives 
 Perform Conceptual Analysis 
 Design Simulation Environment 
 Develop Simulation Environment 
 Integrate and Test Simulation Environment 
 Execute Simulation 
 Analyse Data and Evaluate Results

References

External links 
 SISO DSEEP Product Support Group

IEEE standards
Military simulation